Jackson Township is the name of some places in the U.S. state of Pennsylvania:

Jackson Township, Butler County, Pennsylvania
Jackson Township, Cambria County, Pennsylvania
Jackson Township, Columbia County, Pennsylvania
Jackson Township, Dauphin County, Pennsylvania
Jackson Township, Greene County, Pennsylvania
Jackson Township, Huntingdon County, Pennsylvania
Jackson Township, Lebanon County, Pennsylvania
Jackson Township, Luzerne County, Pennsylvania
Jackson Township, Lycoming County, Pennsylvania
Jackson Township, Mercer County, Pennsylvania
Jackson Township, Monroe County, Pennsylvania
Jackson Township, Northumberland County, Pennsylvania
Jackson Township, Perry County, Pennsylvania
Jackson Township, Snyder County, Pennsylvania
Jackson Township, Susquehanna County, Pennsylvania
Jackson Township, Tioga County, Pennsylvania
Jackson Township, Venango County, Pennsylvania
Jackson Township, York County, Pennsylvania

Pennsylvania township disambiguation pages